Babenki is the name of several rural localities in Russia:

Babenki, Ivanovo Oblast, a village in the Ivanovsky District, Ivanovo Oblast
Babenki, Dzerzhinsky District, Kaluga Oblast, a village in the Dzerzhinsky District, Kaluga Oblast
Babenki, Kaluga, Kaluga Oblast, a village in the city of Kaluga, Kaluga Oblast
Babenki, Yukhnovsky District, Kaluga Oblast, a village in the Yukhnovsky District, Kaluga Oblast
Babenki, Moscow, a village in the Troitsky Administrative Okrug, Moscow
Babenki, Smolensk Oblast, a village in the Vyazemsky District, Smolensk Oblast
Babenki, Kimrsky District, Tver Oblast, a village in the Kimrsky District, Tver Oblast
Babenki, Rzhevsky District, Tver Oblast, a village in the Rzhevsky District, Tver Oblast
Babenki, Selizharovsky District, Tver Oblast, a village in the Selizharovsky District, Tver Oblast
Babenki, Staritsky District, Tver Oblast, a village in the Staritsky District, Tver Oblast